Samuel Dylan Murray Preston (born 16 January 1982), more commonly known simply as Preston, is an English singer in the band the Ordinary Boys. He also appeared in the reality television show Celebrity Big Brother in 2006, in which he finished fourth. After the Ordinary Boys split in 2008, he embarked on a songwriting career. In 2013, he officially reunited the Ordinary Boys and in 2015 they released their self-titled comeback album.

Early life
Samuel Preston was born in Worthing, West Sussex. He was educated at Sompting Abbotts prep school and Bishop Luffa School in Chichester. He is son to Anthony and Miranda Preston (born in Philadelphia), and brother to Alex and Lucy Preston. His grandfather was the Princeton University English professor Samuel Hynes. His brother, Alex Preston, is a novelist. In his teenage years, Preston lived in Philadelphia with his mother's side of the family. He is a descendant of the 19th-century British Prime Minister Charles Grey, 2nd Earl Grey.

Music career
Preston became the lead singer of Worthing-based pop group, the Ordinary Boys. They had a string of top-ten hits in the UK Singles Chart. Their most famous song, "Boys Will Be Boys", featured in the 2007 film Harry Potter and the Order of the Phoenix.

After the Ordinary Boys split, Preston started working on material for a solo album, and released the song "Dressed to Kill", on 5 July 2009 as part of T4. The song samples the introduction from the song "Happy House" by Siouxsie and the Banshees. The single was released on 7 September 2009 but failed to chart after Preston had to delay the launch and pull out of promotional performances after breaking both arms in a bicycle accident. He is now a songwriter. In 2011, Preston co-wrote the number one Olly Murs song "Heart Skips a Beat". Preston announced the reforming of the Ordinary Boys in 2011, and a new 12-date tour. Preston also co wrote the song and duet "Beautiful" by Enrique Iglesias and Kylie Minogue for their respective albums, and his track "Dressed to Kill" was re-recorded by American singer Cher for her album Closer to the Truth.

TV appearances
In January 2006, Preston appeared on Channel 4's fourth series of Celebrity Big Brother. During his time in the house he became close to the eventual winner, Chantelle Houghton. Preston was evicted during the final episode on 27 January 2006, finishing in fourth place.

In 2007, Preston filmed a documentary on voodoo for Channel 4. He has also presented Top of the Pops and CD:UK.

In January 2007, Preston appeared as a guest panellist on comedy gameshow Never Mind the Buzzcocks (Season 20, Episode 3). He walked out of the studio during the programme's recording, offended by jokes made at Houghton's expense by the show's host Simon Amstell, who read extracts from Chantelle's autobiography. In an interview with NME after the incident, he claimed that Simon Amstell didn't write his own jokes, and called him a "snotty little posh boy". He later regretted this, reflecting to the BBC "I'm struggling to think why I would have acted so weird." Speaking of Amstell, Preston said he is "funny, charming and likeable, which made it [walking off] all the more embarrassing".<ref>{{cite web|url=http://www.nme.com/news/the-ordinary-boys/46537|title=Ordinary Boys' Preston: 'I regret walking off 'Never Mind The Buzzcocks - NME|date=6 August 2009}}</ref>

On 24 August 2010, he returned to the Big Brother franchise for Ultimate Big Brother, along with his now ex-wife Chantelle; he finished sixth.

Personal life
A week after the end of Celebrity Big Brother,'' Preston became engaged to his longtime French girlfriend, Camille Aznar. He kept in contact with Houghton from the Big Brother show, and broke up with Aznar a month later to allow Houghton to move into his Brighton flat. He and Houghton got engaged on 11 April 2006 and, in an exclusive £300,000 each deal with OK! magazine, they were married on 25 August 2006 at Dartmouth House in Mayfair, London.

After their honeymoon, the couple moved to Preston's flat in Brighton, East Sussex.

Preston and Houghton announced their separation on 27 June 2007, and received the decree nisi for their divorce on 21 November 2007.

Preston moved to Philadelphia in the US in 2008, where he lived for 3 years. He had American citizenship from his mother's side of the family.

In 2017, he was hospitalised following a fall from a balcony in Denmark. As of 2018, Preston is engaged to Emily Smith.

Discography

Albums

Singles

Songwriting discography

 "Don't Say Goodbye" by Olly Murs (2010)
 "Heart Skips a Beat" by Olly Murs (2011)
 "On My Cloud" by Olly Murs (2011)
 "Hard To Love Somebody" by Nas feat. Arlissa (2012)
 "Dressed To Kill" by Cher (2013)
 "Lighthouse" by Lucy Spraggan (2013)
 "Goodnight Goodbye" by John Newman (2013)
 "Beautiful" by Enrique Iglesias feat. Kylie Minogue (2014)
 "Million Words" by The Vamps (2015)
 "The Reason" by Lower Than Atlantis (2015)
 "Chewing Gum" by Nina Nesbitt (2016)
 "Casual" by Alex Adair (2017)
 "Hands" by Mike Perry (2017)
 "Karma" by Tom Walker (2017)
 "Personal" by The Vamps (2017)
 "Slow Me Down" by Jessie Ware (2017)
 "Starting From Now" by Catherine McGrath (2017)
 "Technology" by Don Broco (2017)
 "What Do I Do" by Sjur (2017)
 "Heartbeats" by Matoma feat. Nina Nesbitt (2018)
 "Please" by Samantha Harvey (2018)
 "Put It On For Me" by Don Diablo feat. Nina Nesbitt (2018)
 "Ruins" by Claire Richards (2018)
 "Slow" by Liam Payne (2018)
 "All I Want (For Christmas)" by Liam Payne (2019)
 "All You Need To Know" by Gryffin feat. Calle Lehmann (2019)
 "Is It Really Me You're Missing?" by Nina Nesbitt (2019)
 "Live Forever" by Liam Payne feat Cheat Codes (2019)
 "Told You So" by Hrvy (2019)

References

External links
 "Dressed To Kill" Single Review
 Statement on Preston's comeback

1982 births
Living people
People from Worthing
The Ordinary Boys
English male singer-songwriters
People educated at Bishop Luffa School